Gran Hermano 10 launched on September 21, 2008, and ended January 22, 2009. It was the tenth Spanish edition of the reality television show Big Brother, which lasted a total of 124 days. The show ended with Ivan as the winner and Orlando as runner-up.

In 2010, season "Gran Hermano: El Reencuentro", Orlando, Gema, Almudena and Ana returned to the house. In 2011, season "El Reencuentro 2", Iván and Loli returned to the house. In the 2016 season "Gran Hermano VIP 4", Liz returned to the house.

Housemates 
When Gran Hermano 10 started, fourteen housemates entered a replica of the old Gran Hermano 1 house. A married couple, Gema and Carlos F. entered the real GH10 house. Their objective was not to be discovered as a married couple. If they were discovered, one of them would be evicted.

Each week, the GH1 housemates had to nominate two contestants with one point each to evict. The two with the most votes would face the public vote. The audience had to decide who would enter the GH10 house and who would be evicted. In Week 6, Javier and Estefanía randomly entered the GH10 house, while Liz entered the GH1 house with Julio and Mirentxu. In Week 7, after a mistake by Gran Hermano, GH10 housemates accidentally discovered that Julio, Liz and Mirentxu weren't evicted; the producers decided to let them enter the GH10 house. On Day 87, Ana, Eva, and Gema earned the opportunity to return to the GH10 and legibility to win the grand prize; housemates in the GH10 house voted for Ana to return and Eva and Gema were re-evicted. On Day 101, Ana was ejected from the house for constantly revealing information from the outside world.

 Raquel, Jie Li, Loli, Nani, Gisela, Gema, Liz and Almudena appeared naked on Interviú (popular magazine that does naked artistic photography of famous people).
 In February 2010, an All Stars edition - Gran Hermano: El Reencuentro debuted; 14 days onto the edition, GH10 housemates Almudena, Orlando, Gema and Ana entered the house.
 Loli and Ivan entered in the first edition of El Reencuentro 2011.
 Gema broke with Carlos and in 2012 she took part in Mujeres y Hombres y Viceversa.
 Liz was 'tronista' of Mujeres y Hombres y Viceversa in 2013.
 Almudena was a journalist on Sálvame.
 Almudena was on Supervivientes: Perdidos en Honduras 2014.
 From January 2016 to February 2016, Liz was in Gran Hermano VIP 4. She was the 5th evicted.

Ana Toro
Ana Toro was 36 years old and was from Granada. She entered the House on the Day 1. She had a special friendship with Germán. Ana was designing her own dresses and she was a very charismatic girl. She had problems with Loli and Almudena for her to be evicted. She was expelled on the Day 24 by 48,3 % of the votes without be in the House 10. She returned on the Day 87 to the House 1 with Eve and Gema, and she managed to return to be a competitor on the Day 94. The program decided to expelled her on the Day 101 for having told things of the exterior to the other contestants.

Almudena
Almudena was 24 years old and was from Murcia. Everyone called her Chiqui. She is the shortest competitor of Big Brother Spain. She entered in the House 1 at Day 1, and passed to the House 10 on Day 24. In House 1, she had arguments with Ana Toro because she did not want to do the deal for to be all nominated. In House 10 she had discussions with Nani and Mirentxu. She loved Orlando, but it wasn't reciprocal. She was called hypocrite by their housemates. She was the 3rd finalist with the 7,8%

Carlos and Gema Fernández
Carlos Fernández was 28, his wife Gema was 26 and they lived in Barcelona. They entered in the House 10 on Day 1 and they had to hide the secret of their marriage from the housemates. Nobody noticed them. He declared that he never wanted to be on the show if it wasn't for Gema. They had a lot of problems with Ivan, as the rest of the house. All of his housemates called him Carlitos. On Day 87 he was evicted with 67% of the votes. They both had a special friendship with Orlando. Gema was the housemate in House 10 to be eliminated (56% of the vote was between Ivan and Gisela on Day 45).

Carlos Hoya
Carlos Hoya was 31 and was from Cantabria. He entered in the House 1 on Day 1, and he passed to House 10 on Day 10. He declared that he and Ivan were enemies before their entrance in Big Brother. In the game, he always had confrontations with Ivan. He liked Loli, but didn't have anything with her in the house. He was evicted on day 59 with the 55,2% of the votes in a close eviction with Ivan, Mirentxu and Liz, and he didn't want to return to the house when the competitors' return was done

Eva
Eva came from A Coruña and was 24 years old. She was farmer and a part-time waitress. She entered in House 1 at Day 1, and she was eliminated on day 10 with 58.6% of the votes in front of Carlos Hoya. She had problems with Ana Toro and Mirentxu. On Day 87, she entered House 1 with Gema and Ana to fight for return to competition but was re-evicted on Day 94. She never set foot in the 10th House.

Germán
German, who was 37 years old, is a television presenter from Barcelona who entered in the House 1 at Day 1. He only spent two days at the house. He was eliminated with 22.5% of the votes of the public, all contestants being nominated. He had a beautiful friendship with Ana Toro. He never set foot in the 10 House. He didn't want to return to the house when the competitors' return.

Gisela
Gisela was 22 years old and was from the Canaries. She entered in House 1 on the Day 1. She developed an infatuation towards Carlos and a strong friendship with Almudena, Loli and Nani. She was nominated with Jie Li by the contestants in House 10 (Gema, Carlos F., Loli, Almudena, Carlos H., Orlando and Ivan) on Day 24 because the housemates of House 1 were all nominated (and it's forbidden by the program); the contestant of House 10 declared that they wanted to receive Gisela in their house, not Jie Li. She didn't comment on who she had nominated.. She was an enemy of Liz and of Ivan. On the Day 80 she was eliminated by 57,9 % of the votes.

Iván
Iván was 35 years old and was from Cantabria. He was model and he declared that he never watched the show before. He entered in the House 1 at Day 1. He declared that he and Carlos were enemies before their entrance in Big Brother. He entered in the House 10 on day 17 after a close eviction with Raquel. He had problems with all of their housemates. He won with the 69,8%.

Javier Palomares
Javier Palomares, who they all called Palomares, was 23 years old and was from Ciudad Real. He was a musician and passed the day singing. He was very feminine. He entered in the House on the Day 1 and went on to the House 10 on the Day 31 in the Room of the Doors. He did not like to nominate because he never had problems with anybody. For him Mirentxu was like a mother. Julito was the best friend of him, and they created a musical group: The Julja. It was expelled on the Day 101 by 42,5 % of the votes. For a long time, he was seeming to be the winner of the game.

Jie Li
Jie Li was a Chinese woman who lived in Madrid. She was 23. She entered in the House 1 at Day 1, and she was eliminated on day 31 with 58,6% of the votes in front of Gisela. She was being nominated by the contestants in House 10 (Gema, Carlos F., Loli, Almudena, Carlos H., Orlando and Ivan) because the housemates of House 1 made a deal for to be all nominated (and it's forbidden by the program); the contestant of House 10 declared that they wanted to receive Gisela in their house, not Jie Li. She had no problem with anyone and made a special relationship with Ana. She never set foot in the 10th House.

Julito
Julio, who they called Julito, was born in Tenerife and he was 28 years old. He entered in the House 1 on the Day 1, and never was nominated by their housemates. He went on to the House 10 on the Day 45 after two weeks living in the House 1 with Mirentxu and Liz. He had a nice friendship with Javier: they formed a musical group called The Julja. Mirentxu was, for him, a mother. He left the house on the Day 109 with 51,6 % of the votes.

Liz
Liz was from Dominican Republic and lived in Guipúzcoa. She was 24 years old. She was international model and had a baby daughter. She entered in the game at Day 31. She wasn't chosen in the Room of the Doors and went to the House 1. She went on to the House 10 on the Day 45 after two weeks living in the House 1 with Mirentxu and Julio. In House 1, she had problems with Loli, Gisela and Nani, and was friend of Ivan, Orlando and Almudena. She was the least evicted, on Day 117 with 51,9% in front of Orlando.

Loli
Loli (Dolores) was 26 and was from Granada. She worked as a beautician and studied biology. She entered in the House 1 at Day 1, and passed to the House 10 on Day 24. In House 1 she had arguments with Ana Toro because she did not want to do the deal to be all nominated. In House 10 she had disagreements with Ivan and Liz. Carlos H. loved her, but she did not want to do anything in the house. On her last weeks, she wanted to be nominated because she did not feel comfortable on the house: she never got out of her bed, and always seems depressed. She was eliminated on Day 66 with 61.9% of the votes in front of Nani and Ivan. She had a strong friendship with Nani and Gisela.

Mirentxu
Mirentxu was from Guipuzcoa and was 69 years old. She is the oldest competitor who has taken part in Big Brother Spain. She entered the House on the Day 1, and never was nominated by their housemates. She went on to the House 10 on the Day 45 after two weeks living in the House 1 with Julito and Liz. She had many problems with Almudena and Iván, who disrupted her sleep. She was taking care of Palomares and Julito as if they were her children. She said often that she wanted to be nominated and leave the house. She did it on Day 94 with 49,9 % of the votes in an expulsion very scolded against Almudena.

Nani
Estefania (who was called Nani) entered in the game at Day 31. She was chosen at random in the Room of the Doors. She was 22 years old and was from Madrid. She was the only competitor who knew that Gema and Carlos were married. In the house, she developed a strong friendship with Loli and Gisela, and was enemy of Almudena, Ivan and Liz. In addition, she had a loving relation with Orlando. She was eliminated on the Day 73 by 69,6 % of the votes. She was never in the House 1.

Orlando
Orlando was 28 years old and was from Valencia. He was a market seller. He entered in the House 1 at Day 1. He only spent two days at that house. He passed on the House 10 at Day 2 for live with Gema and Carlos after be the less voted of all contestant nominated. He had a relationship with Nani and a strong friendship with Ivan, and with Gema and Carlos to. He never been in fights. He was the second finalist with 22,4%.

Raquel
Raquel came from A Coruña and was 33 years old. She worked as a flight attendant on the plane of Real Madrid. She entered in the House 1 at Day 1, and she was eliminated on day 17 with 50.5% of the votes in front of Ivan. The program said that during the Gala, the feedback turned and Raquel ended up being eliminated. She didn't have a special friendship with anyone. She never set foot in the 10th House.

Nominations table

Notes

Blind results
Blind results are shown during debate shows on Sundays.

See also
 Gran Hermano (Spain)

References

2008 Spanish television seasons
2009 Spanish television seasons
GH 10